The 2021 Mercedes-Benz UCI Mountain Bike World Cup was a series of races in Olympic Cross-Country (XCO), Cross-Country Eliminator (XCE), and Downhill (DHI). Each discipline had an Elite Men and an Elite Women category. There were also under-23 categories in the XCO and junior categories in the DHI.

Cross-country

Elite

Under 23

Downhill

Elite

Junior

Cross-country eliminator

E-Mountain Bike Cross-country

World Cup standings
bold denotes race winners.

Cross-country

Men's

Women's

Downhill

Men's

Women's

Cross-country eliminator

E-Mountain Bike Cross-country

See also
2021 UCI Mountain Bike World Championships

References

External links
2021 UCI Mountain Bike World Cup
2021 UCI Mountain Bike Eliminator World Champions
2021 UCI E-Mountain Bike Cross Country World Cup

UCI Mountain Bike World Cup
Mountain Bike World Cup
UCI